Dahira rebeccae is a moth of the family Sphingidae. It was described by Willem Hogenes and Colin G. Treadaway in 1999. It is known from the Philippines.

References

Dahira
Moths described in 1999